Charles Wicksteed (1847–1931) was a British engineer, businessman, and entrepreneur. He is best known as a manufacturer of playground equipment and as the founder of Wicksteed Park.

Biography

Wicksteed was born in Leeds in 1847. His father was Charles Wicksteed, a Unitarian minister and his mother was Jane Lupton. His parents met when Charles Senior arrived in Leeds in 1835 to lead Mill Hill Chapel, at the heart of that industrial city, and two years later they married.

Wicksteed was one of nine children. Sisters included Janet, who wrote a memoir under the name of Mrs Arthur Lewis. Brothers included Philip (Henry), the economist and Unitarian theologian, and (Joseph) Hartley, president of the Institute of Mechanical Engineers, whose daughter Mary Cicely married the Australian surgeon Sir Alan Newton. They had the maverick MP and mining engineer Arnold Lupton as their first cousin.

At the age of 16, Wicksteed accepted an apprenticeship at locomotive manufacturer Kitson & Hewitson. When he was 21, Wicksteed founded Charles Wicksteed and Co., Ltd., a steam plough contracting business. Initially based in Norfolk, he moved operations to Kettering in 1872. In 1876, he established an engineering workshop called The Stamford Road Works. The firm was successful, and he sold his ploughing business in 1894.

In 1907, Wicksteed's firm developed a motor car transmission. Although considered a noteworthy invention, it was a commercial failure. Wicksteed then pivoted to power tools, including hydraulic hacksaw and circular saw machines. These inventions were highly successful and subsequently mass produced. During World War I, Wicksteed principally manufactured munitions, gauges, and gears for the war effort.

In 1914, Wicksteed purchased land on the edge of Kettering and, inspired by Ebenezer Howard, set about creating the Barton Seagrave garden suburb. Architects Gotch & Saunders worked with Wicksteed to develop plans, including a large park at the centre of the estate. However, Wicksteed's attention soon focused on making the park a better place for children to play and in time he developed robust swings, slides and other playground equipment.

Wicksteed Park opened in 1921 and the children's playground soon became the central feature. In contrast to earlier thinking about playground provision, which emphasised the segregation of girls and boys at play, Wicksteed encouraged children and adults to play together, opened the playground on Sundays and limited rules and regulations. As Wicksteed set about improving the play equipment in his park, he also turned his playground inventions into commercial products that would soon be sold across the country and the world.  

In 2013, a prototype swing of his was unearthed near Wicksteed Park dating back to the early 1920s. It is believed to be the UK's oldest working swing. As of 2022, Wicksteed's company Wicksteed Leisure Limited continues to manufacture play equipment.

Wicksteed died by suicide at his home in Kettering on the 19th March 1931, shortly before his 84th birthday.

The Wicksteed Charitable Trust, established to manage Charles Wicksteeds' charitable legacy has been run by his descendants to the present day however the organisation has twice been investigated by the Charity Commission first in 2004 and again in 2021/2022.

References

1847 births
1931 deaths
Businesspeople from Leeds
Engineers from Yorkshire
Playground equipment